Mingo Creek is a stream in the U.S. state of Mississippi.

Mingo is a name derived from the Choctaw language meaning "chief".

References

Rivers of Mississippi
Rivers of Clarke County, Mississippi
Mississippi placenames of Native American origin